Mateusz Lewandowski (born 18 March 1993) is a Polish former professional footballer. Having played mostly as a left-back throughout his career, he switched to a midfielder role in its latter stages.

Career statistics

Club

Honours

Lechia Gdańsk
Polish Cup: 2018–19

References

External links
 
 

1993 births
Living people
Polish footballers
Poland under-21 international footballers
Poland youth international footballers
Polish expatriate footballers
Association football midfielders
Wisła Płock players
Pogoń Szczecin players
Virtus Entella players
Śląsk Wrocław players
Lechia Gdańsk players
Radomiak Radom players
Ekstraklasa players
I liga players
IV liga players
Serie B players
Expatriate footballers in Italy
Polish expatriate sportspeople in Italy
Sportspeople from Płock